Ice fog is a type of fog consisting of fine ice crystals suspended in the air. It should be distinguished from diamond dust, a precipitation of sparse ice crystals falling from a clear sky. 

Ice fog is not the same thing as freezing fog, a phenomenon where the liquid water droplets making up the fog freezes to surfaces forming a rime.

In the United States 
Ice fog can be quite common in interior and northern Alaska, since the temperature frequently drops below  in the winter months. Ice fog only forms under specific conditions; the humidity has to be near 100% as the air temperature drops to well below , allowing ice crystals to form in the air. The ice crystals will then settle onto surfaces.

Supposedly, early settlers called it "white death" because they believed the crystals got into their lungs and caused death.

References

External links 
 

Fog
Precipitation